Plasminogen activators are serine proteases that catalyze the activation of plasmin via proteolytic cleavage of its zymogen form plasminogen. Plasmin is an important factor in fibrinolysis, the breakdown of fibrin polymers formed during blood clotting. There are two main plasminogen activators: urokinase (uPA) and tissue plasminogen activator (tPA). Tissue plasminogen activators are used to treat medical conditions related to blood clotting including embolic or thrombotic stroke, myocardial infarction, and pulmonary embolism.

Plasminogen activators are inhibited by plasminogen activator inhibitor-1, plasminogen activator inhibitor-2, and protein C inhibitor.

Function 
Produced mainly in the liver, plasminogen is the inactive zymogen form of plasmin, and circulates in plasma in a closed conformation that cannot be activated.  Binding clots or cell surface causes its conformation to change, allowing it to be activated by plasminogen activators.  Plasminogen activators do so by cleaving the R561/V562 peptide bond, producing the active protein plasmin, which catalyzes the degradation of fibrin polymers that make up the structure of blood clots.

Inhibition 
The main inhibitor of tissue plasminogen activator and urokinase is plasminogen activator inhibitor-1 (PAI-1). Plasminogen activator inhibitor-1 is a serine protease, synthesized by endothelial cells, that specifically inhibits tissue plasminogen activator (tPA) and urokinase (uPA). Tissue plasminogen activator and urokinase are the activators of plasminogen and results in the breakdown of blood clots (fibrinolysis).

PAI-1 levels has also been studied in patients and how they influence certain diseases. Elevated serum levels of PAI-1 have been found in obese individuals.  Elevated levels of PAI-1 also seem to increase the risk of atherothrombotic events and may also promote vascular disease.

Plasminogen activator inhibitor-2 (PAI-2) is also a serine protease that inactivates tPA and uPA. PAI-2 is produced by the placenta and only found in high quantities in the blood during pregnancy.

Factors 
Factor XIa and XIIa are two main factors involved in the plasminogen activator. Factor XI (FXI) is a serine protase produced by the liver and circulates in its inactive form. Deficiency in factor XI is known to cause hemophilia C.  Factor XIIa is another plasma protein that is involved in the activation of zymogen factor is activated into factor XIa. This activation is important to the coagulation cascade.

Applications 
Due to its contribution to fibrinolysis, tissue plasminogen activator is used medically to treat blood clot-related disorders including thrombotic or embolic stroke, myocardial infarction, and pulmonary embolism. It is manufactured using recombinant techniques and is sold as alteplase, reteplase, and tenecteplase.  Alteplase was the first of these versions to go on the market, and has the same exact structure as tPA.  Reteplase and tenecteplase both received FDA approval after alteplase, and have nonidentical structures to tPA. These recombinant forms of tPA have been shown to have a longer half-life in the blood and a greater resistance to inhibition, resulting in  an increased capacity to treat thrombolytic diseases.

Urokinase is similarly used in the medical field, specifically for the treatment of pulmonary embolism.

Plasminogen Activator Role in Breast Cancer 
Plasminogen activator inhibitor-1 not only functions as an inhibitor, but other roles of PAI-1 could suggest it could contribute to cancer. The other roles of PAI-1 include, cell de-adhesion, cell proliferation, apoptosis, and cell signaling. These roles could suggest that PAI-1 expression in the tumor microenvironment enhances tumor cell progression. Urokinase cleaves the zymogen plasminogen into serine protease plasmin. The elevated levels of uPA is an indicator of cancer which could be found in the carcinoma of the breast. Plasmin can activate matrix metalloproteases (MMP's) in the extracellular matrix (ECM). MMP activation contributes to tumor cell invasion and metastasis by degradation of ECM components.

References

External links 
 

Hematology